François Joseph Bara, also written Barra (30 July 1779 in Palaiseau – 7 December 1793 in Jallais), was a young French republican drummer boy at the time of the Revolution, and is known for his death and martyrdom at only 13 years old at the hands of pro-Monarchist forces at Vendée.

Life, death, and legacy 

Bara's father was a woodranger and his mother was a domestic servant. Both worked in the Palaiseau district for the Princes of Condé.

Bara was in fact too young to join the army, but attached himself to a unit fighting counter revolutionaries in Vendée. After his death General J.-B. Desmarres gave this account, by letter, to the convention. "Yesterday this courageous youth, surrounded by brigands, chose to perish rather than give them the two horses he was leading."

The boy's death was seized on as an opportunity by revolutionaries, who praised him at the Convention's tribune saying that "only the French have thirteen-year-old heroes". But rather than simply being killed by Breton royalists who solely wanted to steal horses, Bara was transformed into a figure who denied the Ancien Régime at the cost of death. His story became that having been trapped by the enemy and being ordered to cry "Vive le Roi" ("Long live the King") to save his own life, he preferred instead to die crying "Vive la République" ("Long live the Republic").

His remains were to be transferred to the Panthéon during a revolutionary festival in his honor but the event was cancelled when Robespierre was overthrown the day before it was to take place.

Commemoration 

 A 1794 painting by Jacques-Louis David depicts the dying Bara.
 A statue of Bara (called Barra) lying dead by David d'Angers in 1838.
 An 1880 painting (La Mort de Bara) by Jean-Joseph Weerts also depicts Bara's death.
 A painting (La Mort de Bara) by Charles Moreau-Vauthier depicts Bara as a dead drummer boy.
 A painting (Bara) by Jean-Jacques Henner in 1882 
 A street in the 6th arrondissement of Paris is named after him.
 Bara is alluded to in the Chant du départ
 A ship of the line was named Barra in his honour
 There is a statue in his honour at Palaiseau in the Southern suburbs of Paris.
 Opera "Joseph Barra" by André Ernest Modeste Grétry

References

External links

1780 births
1793 deaths
People from Palaiseau
Child soldiers
People of the French Revolution
French military personnel of the French Revolutionary Wars
French military personnel killed in action